Donald Allen Bonner (June 22, 1935 – September 10, 2021) is a  Democratic member of the North Carolina General Assembly representing the state's forty-eighth House district, including constituents in Hoke, Robeson and Scotland counties.  He is a retired educator from Rowland, North Carolina. Bonner died on September 10, 2021.

Recent electoral history

2002

2000

References

External links

|-

1935 births
2021 deaths
People from Robeson County, North Carolina
North Carolina Central University alumni
East Carolina University alumni
20th-century American politicians
21st-century American politicians
20th-century African-American politicians
African-American men in politics
21st-century African-American politicians
Educators from North Carolina
African-American state legislators in North Carolina
Democratic Party members of the North Carolina House of Representatives